An excursion is a trip by a group of people, usually made for leisure, education, or physical purposes. It is often an adjunct to a longer journey or visit to a place, sometimes for other (typically work-related) purposes.

Public transportation companies issue reduced price excursion tickets to attract business of this type.  Often these tickets are restricted to off-peak days or times for the destination concerned.

Short excursions for education or for observations of natural phenomena are called field trips. One-day educational field studies are often made by classes as extracurricular exercises, e.g. to visit a natural or geographical feature. 

The term is also used for short military movements into foreign territory, without a formal announcement of war.

See also 
 Business trip
 Field trip
 Picnic
 Escorted tour

References 

Types of tourism